Debugging is the process of finding and resolving of defects that prevent correct operation of computer software or a system.

Debug may also refer to:

 Debug (command), a command in DOS, OS/2 and Microsoft Windows
 Debug (magazine) or De:Bug, 1997–2014, a German magazine
 Debug (film), a 2014 Canadian science fiction horror film

See also